Koontz is the surname of the following notable people:
Charley Koontz (born 1987), American actor
Dean Koontz (born 1945), American author
Elizabeth Duncan Koontz (1919–1989), African-American educator
Harold Koontz (1909–1984), American business consultant
Joe Koontz (born 1945), American football player
Lawrence L. Koontz, Jr. (born 1940), Senior Justice of the Supreme Court of Virginia
Robin Koontz (born 1954), American children's book author and illustrator
Roscoe L. Koontz (1922–1997), American health physicist 
Stephe Koontz, American politician
William Henry Koontz (1830–1911), member of the U.S. House of Representatives

Surnames from given names